Allen Lewis may refer to:

Allen Montgomery Lewis (1909–1993), barrister, public servant and Governor-General of Saint Lucia
Allen Lewis (sportswriter) (1916–2003), American sports writer
Allen Cleveland Lewis (1821–1877), founder of the Lewis Institute
Allen Lewis (footballer) (1916–1986), Australian rules footballer
Allen Lewis (artist) (1873-1957), American artist

See also
Alan Lewis (disambiguation) 
Alun Lewis (disambiguation)
Allan Lewis (disambiguation)
Lewis Allen (disambiguation)